Fernyhough is a surname. Notable people with the surname include:

Bernard Fernyhough (1932–2000), British Anglican priest
Ernest Fernyhough (1908–1993), British politician
Rowland Fernyhough (born 1954), British equestrian

See also
Ferneyhough